The Athletics at the 2016 Summer Paralympics – Men's 800 metres T54 event at the 2016 Paralympic Games took place on 14–15 September 2016, at the Estádio Olímpico João Havelange.

Heats

Heat 1 
19:15 14 September 2016:

Heat 2 
19:15 14 September 2016:

Heat 3 
19:15 14 September 2016:

Final 
12:02 15 September 2016:

Notes

Athletics at the 2016 Summer Paralympics
2016 in men's athletics